is a former group rhythmic gymnast and current television reporter in Japan.

Career 
Hatakeyama has represented Japan at international competitions. She participated at the 2012 Summer Olympics. She competed at world championships, including at the 2015 World Rhythmic Gymnastics Championships where she won the bronze medal in the 5 ribbons event.

Since her retirement after the 2016 Summer Olympics, Hatakeyama has promoted products and brands, appeared on variety and comedy television programs, and reported on sports for NHK's "Sunday Sports 2020" show. In 2018 she performed a modern dance to accompany enka singer Midori Oka during the 69th NHK Kōhaku Uta Gassen.

Personal life

Hatakeyama married baseball star Seiya Suzuki on December 7, 2019.

She is a fan of Taylor Swift.

References

1994 births
Living people
Japanese rhythmic gymnasts
Place of birth missing (living people)
Gymnasts at the 2012 Summer Olympics
Olympic gymnasts of Japan
Medalists at the Rhythmic Gymnastics World Championships
20th-century Japanese women
21st-century Japanese women